Hombisilu is a 1978 Indian Kannada-language romantic drama film directed by Geethapriya. It is based on the novel of the same name by Usha Navarathnaram. The film starred Vishnuvardhan, Aarathi and Leelavathi. Vishnuvardhan was awarded with Karnataka State Film Award for Best Actor for his performance in this film. The film was a musical blockbuster with all the songs composed by Rajan–Nagendra considered evergreen hits.

Synopsis
Dr. Nataraj (Vishnuvardhan) is desperately seeking a lady doctor for his nursing home. His aunt (Leelavathi) introduces him to her assistant, Doctor Roopa (Aarathi) who falls in love with him at first sight but is disappointed to know that he is only looking for a female assistant doctor. While family pressures force her to marry him, she refuses to consummate the marriage because of her grudge. Circumstances introduce another young woman Vasanthi (Vaishali Kasaravalli) as a second lady doctor in Nataraj's nursing home. The glamorous Vasanthi is more interested in the good looking Nataraj rather than her duty as a doctor. This deepens the rift between Nataraj and Roopa. How the differences are resolved for a happy ending forms the rest of the movie set against the backdrop of the nursing home.

The film is based on the debut novel of famous Kannada author Usha Navaratnaram. Usha's novels mainly focussed on the problems of working women in the male dominated world. Usha herself being a doctor has written many novels with a female doctor as the center character, of which two - Hombisilu and Bandhana were made into films. Vishnu featured as the male lead in both. Despite the female-centric theme, Vishnuvardhan did hold his own against the indomitable heroines - Aarathi in Hombisilu and Suhasini in Bandhana - who were considered his equals in the craft - and impressed the intelligent Kannada audience. The two films fetched him his two state awards.

Cast
 Vishnuvardhan as Dr. Nataraj
 Aarathi as Dr. Roopa
 Vaishali Kasaravalli as Dr.Vasanthi
 Leelavathi as Dr.Kamalamma
 Uma Shivakumar as Raji
 Shivaram as Dr. Srinath 
 N. S. Rao as Ranga
 Shakti Prasad as Rangappa

Soundtrack
The music was composed by Rajan–Nagendra. All the songs composed for the film were received extremely well and considered as evergreen songs. Rajan–Nagendra reused the song Jeeva Veene in the 1979 Telugu movie Intinti Ramayanam as  Veena Venuvaina Sarigama and in the 1979 Tamil movie Veetukku Veedu Vasapadi as Aadal Paadal Kaadhal Enbathu Appodhu.

Awards
 1977–78 - Karnataka State Film Award for Best Actor - Vishnuvardhan

References

Kannada audio

External links

1978 films
1970s Kannada-language films
1978 romantic drama films
Indian romantic drama films
Films based on Indian novels
Films scored by Rajan–Nagendra
Films directed by Geethapriya